The Star Competition at the 1992 Summer Olympics was held from 27 July to 4 August 1992, in Barcelona, Spain. Points were awarded for placement in each race. The best six out of seven race scores did count for the final placement.

Results 

DNF = Did Not Finish, DSQ = Disqualified, PMS = Premature Start
Crossed out results did not count for the total result.
 = Male,  = Female

Daily standings

Notes

References 
 
 
 
 
 

 

Star
Star (keelboat) competitions